Sybra excavatipennis is a species of beetle in the family Cerambycidae. It was described by Breuning in 1960.

References

excavatipennis
Beetles described in 1960